In a City Transformed is a 1966 novel by Swedish author Per Anders Fogelström. It is the fourth novel of the City novels.

References

1966 Swedish novels
Swedish-language novels
Novels set in Stockholm
Family saga novels